The Hongdu N-5, (N-5 - Nongye-Feiji-5 - agricultural aircraft-5), originally known as the Nanchang N-5, is a Chinese agricultural aircraft. First flown in 1989, and entering into production in 1992, the N-5 is a single-engined low-wing monoplane, and is available in versions powered by a piston engine or a turboprop.

Development and design
In November 1987, the Nanchang Aircraft Manufacturing Company (which was renamed the Hongdu Aviation Industry Group in 1998) began design of a modern, purpose designed agricultural aircraft, with the intention of replacing some of the large numbers of license-built Antonov An-2s in use for that purpose in China. The resulting design, the N-5 first flew on 26 December 1989. It is a single-engined monoplane of conventional layout for an agricultural aircraft with a low-wing situated ahead of the cockpit.  It is of all-metal construction, except for a glassfibre hopper for chemicals ahead of the cockpit, which is sealed and pressurised to protect the crew during spraying operations, and has an undercarriage.  It is flown by a single pilot, with a tandem jump-seat provided to allow a mechanic to be carried.  It is powered by a single Lycoming O-720 eight-cylinder piston engine, and was certified as airworthy in this form by the Civil Aviation Administration of China on 12 August 1992. The N-5A was certified by the Federal Aviation Administration for use in the United States on 26 February 2007.

In response to demands from Chinese operators for a more powerful aircraft, studies were made of versions powered both by more powerful piston and turboprop engines,  before settling on a Czech Walter M601 turboprop to produce the N-5B, this variant replacing the nosewheel undercarriage of the N-5A with a tailwheel undercarriage. The N-5B first flew on 28 December 2006.

Variants
N-5A
Main production version, with nosewheel undercarriage and 298 kW (400 hp) Lycoming IO-720 piston engine.
N-5B 
Version powered by 580 kW (777 hp) Walter M601F turboprop engine. Tailwheel undercarriage.

Specifications (N-5A)

See also

Notes

References

 Lambert, Mark (ed.). Jane's All The World's Aircraft 1993–94. Coulsdon, UK: Jane's Data Division, 1993. .
 Sobie, Brendan. "Hongdu switches engines to uprate agricultural aircraft". Flight International, 15–21 June 2004. p. 29.
 Taylor, Michael J.H. (ed.). Brassey's World Aircraft & Systems Directory 1999/2000. London:Brassey's, 1999. .

External links
https://web.archive.org/web/20081120201755/http://www.hongdu-aviation.com/english/html/product-3.htm
https://web.archive.org/web/20081120213533/http://www.hongdu-aviation.com/english/html/product-4.htm

1980s Chinese agricultural aircraft
Hongdu aircraft
Low-wing aircraft
Aircraft first flown in 1989